Daniel Huber (Basel, 23 June 1768 – 3 December 1829) was a Swiss mathematician and astronomer. He worked at the University of Basel and became chancellor in 1804.

Works

References 

1768 births
1829 deaths
19th-century Swiss mathematicians
19th-century Swiss astronomers
Scientists from Basel-Stadt
18th-century Swiss astronomers
18th-century Swiss mathematicians